Pallikoodam is a word in Malayalam and Tamil that means 'school'.

Pallikoodam may also refer to:

 Pallikoodam (film), a Tamil film released in 2007
 Pallikoodam (school), a private school in Kottayam, Kerala founded by Mary Roy